Herbert the Younger (circa 950–995) was the Count of Troyes and Meaux.  He was the son of Robert of Vermandois and Adelaide Werra, daughter of Gilbert, Duke of Burgundy. He belonged to the Herbertien dynasty, an illegitimate branch of the Carolingian dynasty.

He inherited his father's domains in 966 and those of his uncle, Herbert III of Omois, in 984. He was a partisan and supporter of King Lothair and followed on his conquest of Upper Lorraine, after which he was guarded the captive Godfrey I of Verdun. After the death of Lothair's heir, Louis V, in 987, Herbert sided with Odo I of Blois and backed Charles, Duke of Lower Lorraine, probably his brother-in-law.

Herbert's wife's name is unknown.

 His son and heir was Stephen.

References

|-

|-

|-

950 births

995 deaths
Year of birth uncertain

10th-century French people
Frankish warriors
Herbertien dynasty
Counts of Champagne
Counts of Troyes
Counts of Meaux
Counts of Omois